Kronk Gym is a boxing gym located in Detroit, once led by trainer Emanuel Steward. It was run out of the basement of the oldest recreation center of the City of Detroit, and became a household word in the sport of boxing and its gold shorts a magnet to young talent following the enormous success and high profile of multiple World Champion and Boxing Hall of Famer Thomas "The Hitman" Hearns in the 1980s.

The training facility opened shortly after World War I (~1920) and closed in 2006. It reopened in 2015.

History

Original Detroit gym
Kronk began to earn fame during the late 1970s, when prospects like Hilmer Kenty, Thomas Hearns and Mickey Goodwin trained there. In 1980, Kenty became Kronk's first world champion, Hearns following him months after. In 1983, Kronk fighter Milton McCrory won the WBC welterweight title vacated by Sugar Ray Leonard; Jimmy Paul beat Harry Arroyo for the International Boxing Federation's world lightweight title in 1985. Duane Thomas, another Kronk fighter, beat John Mugabi for the WBC light middleweight title in 1986. McCrory's brother, Steve McCrory, was also a world champion who as an amateur won the flyweight gold medal at the 1984 Summer Olympics in Los Angeles. In 1984 four Kronk team members of various weight classes were ranked world's top ten by AIBA: Steve McCrory #1 at 112 lbs, Mark Breland #1 at 147 lbs, Frank Tate #5 at 156 lbs, and Ricky Womack #3 at 178 lbs.

In the 1990s the Kronk stable included two-time WBA welterweight champion Mark Breland, top amateur prospect and future contender Tarick Salmaci, and repeat welterweight contender Oba Carr.

Among the many world champions who trained at Kronk at least once during their careers are Michael Moorer, Wilfred Benítez (in the Tucson gym), Héctor Camacho, Julio César Chávez, Naseem Hamed, Evander Holyfield, Lennox Lewis, Jermain Taylor and Tyson Fury.

Tucson gym
Kronk opened a second gym in Tucson, Arizona during the 1990s. A new host of fighters who would later become world champions arrived there, including Gerald McClellan.  The Kronk "franchise" began to sell Kronk merchandise through catalog sales.

In 1998 Kronk opened Kronk Gym website, promoting the gyms and their fighters.

Detroit gym closure
In September 2006, the original gym at 5555 McGraw Avenue between 33rd and Junction Streets in Detroit closed temporarily after thieves stole copper water pipes, cutting off supply to the building. Boxers relocated to a Dearborn Gold's Gym. A "Save the Kronk" campaign aimed at keeping the facilities from closing due to budget shortfall was spearheaded by Emanuel Steward. The campaign would ultimately work toward building a new Kronk.

The gym and recreation center was officially closed by the Recreation Department on November 28, 2006 due to the prohibitive cost of repairs to the plumbing and building infrastructure.

In the past few years, the Detroit gym relocated to a new facility in a storefront on West Warren Avenue.

On October 7, 2017, the original Kronk Gym went up in flames in a suspicious fire. The roof was destroyed and the basement gym was heavily damaged.

Reopening 
The new facility opened on Memorial Day weekend in 2015 at 9520 Mettetal St.

On August 20, 2020, during the COVID-19 pandemic and subsequent restrictions on sports events, the gym hosted its first ever professional boxing event, a long-time dream held by Steward. The card was headlined by Kronk fighter Vladimir Shishkin who defeated Oscar Riojas via ninth-round technical knockout.

References

External links
 Kronkgym.com official website.
 Inside the abandoned Kronk Gym at Detroiturbex.com
 Detroit's Legendary Kronk Gym: Down for the Count
 Boxing's Most Famous Gyms
Boxing in Michigan
Boxing gyms in the United States
2006 disestablishments in Michigan 1980 Manny Steward kronk gym held the 15 years and younger Silver gloves jr Olympics,Micky Goodwyn,Milton Mccrory,Hilmer Kentay,And Duane Johnson All world champions helped host the event. Roosevelt McKinley trainer with AnnArbor /